
Gmina Ornontowice is a rural gmina (administrative district) in Mikołów County, Silesian Voivodeship, in southern Poland.

Neighbouring gminas
Gmina Ornontowice is bordered by the towns of Mikołów and Orzesze, and by the gminas of Czerwionka-Leszczyny and Gierałtowice.

References

Ornontowice
Mikołów County